Davidyan or Davidian is an Armenian surname meaning "son of David", thus making it equivalent to Davidson.

Notable people with the surname include:
Levon Davidian (1944–2009), Iranian parliament member, psychiatrist and professor
Marie Davidian, American biostatistician
David Davidyan (born 1997), Russian footballer
Nelson Davidyan (1950–2016), Ukrainian-Armenian Greco-Roman wrestler

See also
Davidian (disambiguation)
Claim of the biblical descent of the Bagrationi dynasty

Armenian-language surnames
Patronymic surnames
Surnames from given names